Toothless George (born Yurgi F Šiugždinis; June 1, 1973) is an American punk rock musician. He is best known for his work with The Halflings, Toothless George & His One-Man Band, and Percocettes.  George is a former professional skateboarder and currently lives in Tokyo, Japan.

History

Early life

Šiugždinis was born in Vilnius, Lithuania, and raised in West Chester, Pennsylvania. His father worked at a gas station, and his mother was a truck driver.  He was turned onto punk rock in 1985 accidentally, while attending North Coventry Elementary.  He said in Scratched Magazine, “Me becoming a punk rocker had nothing to do with the music.  I listened to New Edition, and L.L. Cool J.  No one would let me sit at their lunch table except the punk rock kids.  That why I’m a punk rocker.  I got into the music later.”

Musical History

One of the first bands that Toothless George played in was the straight edge hard core band Bound By Blue with Matt Summers (Shark Attack) and Matt Smith (Shark Attack, Rain on the Parade).  After Bound By Blue disbanded, he and Smith performed in the punk rock group Mao & The Chinese Revolution from their beginning in 1987 until they disbanded in 1993. They released one 7” on Creep Records.  Soon thereafter, George founded the Halflings with Matt Drastic (Teen Idols, The Queers) and Donnie Switchblade.  They ultimately broke up in 1996.  They had released four 7” vinyl records, and were featured on twelve various artist compilations.  Shortly thereafter, George put the band back together one last time with Steve Ferrell (Kid Dynamite) and Dave Sausage (The Boils) but never played out with that line up.

In 2001, George joined The Bedrockers, with his older brother Ed Rocker. While with The Bedrockers, George started performing as a one-man band on the side- playing guitar, bass drum, snare drum, two tambourines, harmonica, and singing simultaneously.  When The Bedrockers broke up in 2003, the one-man band became his full-time band.  He has released two e.p.’s , one full album, and has been featured on three compilations.  
Toothless George, and girlfriend, Cole Della-Zucca started The Percocettes together in 2006. They released two c.d.’s and performed hundreds of shows in The United States, Europe, and Japan.

In 2007, Toothless George was awarded Barrymore Award for a theatrical musical he wrote with Brat Productions.

Discography

Mao & The Chinese Revolution 
 "Live at Unisound" cassette (Self Released) 1990
 "Live at Sabatino's" cassette (Self Released) 1991
 "America's Finest" 7-inch(Creep Records) 1993

The Halflings 
 "Memory Lapse" 7-inch (Creep Records) 1994
 v/a - "120 Days..." VHS/BETA (Groove Productions) 1994
 The Diplomats & The Halflings 2/3 song split 7-inch (Pink Rock/Alien Records) 1995
 v/a - "Matthau Records Compilation" (Matthau Records) 1995
 "Frabbajabba!" 7-inch (Creep Records) 1995
 v/a - "Dad, I Can't Breathe" L.P. (Creep Records) 1995
 "A Kiss For Christmas" 7-inch single (Switchblade Records) 1995
 v/a - "Suburban Voice Sampler" Suburban Voice Magazine) 1997
 v/a - "So Punk, Barely Visible To The Naked Eye" CD (Ripped Records) 1996
 v/a - "Got A Minute?" CD (Microcosm Records) 1997
 v/a - "Punk Will Eat Itself" cassette (PWEI Zine) 1995
 v/a - "Rookies In Underwear" cassette (Insane Records) 1995
 v/a - I'm A Luck Dragon" CD (Atrayu Records) 19??
 v/a - "Exploitational Sampler" CD (Creep Records) 1996
 v/a - "Stop Homophobia" Vol. II 7-inch (Turkey Bastor Records) 1995
 v/a - "What Are You Looking At!" CD (Switchblade Records) 1996
 "I Don't Wanna Go To School" CD/10" (Unreleased) 1997
 "Runaround Sue" 7-inch (Double A Records) 1999
 v/a- "Punk Station 2" cassette (WFMU 91.1FM) 1996

The Bedrockers
 "Suck Knob On Zero" 5 song CD (Self Released) 2002
 "Code Blue" Promo CD (Self Released) 2002
 v/a - "Punk Vs. Emo" Double CD (Fast Music/Mindset Records) 2003
 v/a - "Say Ten Sampler" CD (Say-Ten Records) 2003
 v/a - "Play It Loud" Vol. II (Freddie & Cary's Label) 2003
 "When We Meet Again" CD-R (Self Released) 2003
 v/a - "Everlasting Sampler" CD (Wonka Vision Records) 2004
 v/a - "Voices In The Wilderness" CD (DIY & Proud Records) 2005

Toothless George & His One-Man Band

 "Live In NYC!" Limited Edition 5 song CD-R (Strip Tees Record Division) 2004
 "Lone Wolf" 4 song 7-inch (Jett Black Records) 2004
 "Live In NYC!" 5 song CD (Strip Tees Record Division) 2004
 v/a - "Get Outta Philly!" CD (Tick Tick Tick Records) 2005
 "Lone Wolf" 6 song CD (Schuylkill Records) 2005
 v/a - "Philly Roller Girls Presents: Hellybilly Horrors vs. Urban Legends" DVD 2006
 "Promo" 2 song CD (Strip Tees Record Division) 2006
 "Lone Wolf" 9 song LP (Criminal Records) 2006
 v/a - "Killed By A One-Man Band" 7-inch (Squoodge Records & Drunk'nRoll Schallplatten) 2006
 v/a - "Attack Of The One-Man Bands!" Double CD (Rock N Roll Pergatory Records) 2007
 "The Sound Of Titties" 25 song CD (Strip Tees Record Division)2007
 v/a - "God Save The Queers" CD (Asian Man Records) 2008
 "& The Heavy Metal Hookers" (Strip Tees Record Division) 2009
 v/a - "Flogging Margarette Original Soundtrack" DVD (Warner Brothers) 2008

Toothless George & His Ten-Man Band

 "Long In The Tooth! - Tenth Anniversary Show Live" LP (Self Released) 2013

Percocettes
 "Seventeen" b/w "Inflatable Girl" 2 song CD (Self Released) 2007
 "Say It To My Fist!" 4 song CD (Self Released) 2009

Cylon 78

 Self Titled digital E.P.

Poison Hearts (A.C.)
 "Hostile City" digital single (Self Released) 2019
 "Has-Beens & Wannabes" digital single (Self Released) 2020

Bibliography
 "Angel of the Aegean" Memoirs (Strip Tees Books) 2007
 "One Night Only" (Strip Tees Books) 2011
 "Band Together" (Strip Tees Books) 2012
 "Fuck America: Travel Guide for Fuckin' Enthusiasts" Coloring Book (Strip Tees Books) 2016
 "A Celebration of Pride" Coloring Book (Strip Tees Books) 2017
 "Fuck Trump" Coloring Book (Strip Tees Books) 2018

References

Links

American punk rock musicians
Living people
1975 births